Notre Dame High School (also known as NDHS, Notre Dame H.S., Notre Dame, or simply Dame) is an all-girls Roman Catholic secondary school in Toronto, Ontario, Canada. This school is a member of the Toronto Catholic District School Board (formerly the Metropolitan Separate School Board) serving the Upper Beaches neighbourhood.

Tne school was founded by the Sisters of the Congregation of Notre Dame in 1941. Notre Dame is one of 30 high schools run by the TCDSB and one of six all-girls schools, and currently has an enrolment of 670 students. The school's patron saint is Marguerite Bourgeoys.

History
In 1941, the Congregation of Notre Dame founded Notre Dame High School to provide education for young Catholic women. Up until recently, the Sisters of the Congregation have been teaching at the school throughout its long history. The school has grown over the years such as in 1963, O’Connor Hall was built as the second building of the school; the first being the main building. In the 1970s, Notre Dame had a total of 1,111 students, and moved into the second and third floors of the neighbouring St. John Catholic School. Currently, the school uses three buildings, but only part of the third floor of St. John's.

In 1967, the school reached an agreement with the Metropolitan Separate School Board, placing the Grade 9 and 10 students would be under the publicly funded separate school system and Grades 11, 12, and 13 would continue by the Congregation. In 1984, the government started funding the last three years of high school and by 1987, Notre Dame was ceased as a private school, joining the board in the process.

Notre Dame underwent two accommodation reviews due to excessive overcrowding and its site size of an acre due to lack of playing field and the use of St. John's third floor. First in 2001 when the board attempted to acquire additional land for the construction of a larger school, then again in 2009 when the board attempted to relocate and/or consolidate Notre Dame with either St. Patrick or Neil McNeil with the building demolished and the school yard being expanded back to St. John. Subsequently, the board attempted to relocate the school and Neil McNeil to the closed Midland Avenue Collegiate Institute and the options were unsuccessful.

Tradition
The most notable tradition that has been held at Notre Dame are the white dresses that are worn at the Prom. Though many senior students in the past have fought with the parent council to change, it has yet to happen. As of 2019 this has changed, the students are allowed to wear any colour.

Events
12 Days of Christmas
Academic Awards and Honor Roll Breakfast
Activity Day
Artsmas
Art's Night
Athletic Banquet
Biennial Multicultural Day
Biennial Musical Theatre
Biennial Sears Drama Festival
Black History Month
Camp Olympia
Christmas Baskets
Christmas Assembly
Opening Assembly
Closing Assembly
Dance Off
Grade Eight Open House
Grade Nine Getaway
Grade Twelve Retreat
Halloween Assembly
International Women's Day 
March Break Trip
Poetry Night
Semi-Formal
Ski Day
Spirit Week
Thanksgiving Food Drive
Walk-A-Thon

Athletics
Badminton
Cross Country
Tennis
Swimming 
Basketball
Cross Country
Hockey
Ski
Soccer
Softball
Table Tennis
Track
Volleyball

Clubs
Anime Club
Art Club
Avidity Hip Hop Crew
Board Game Club
Black History Club
Catholic Leadership Group
Chaplaincy Team
Contemporary Dance Company
CSUNA
Dame Detectives 
Fashion Club
Film Club
Fitness Club
Girl Up
God Squad
Green Team
Junior/Senior Band
Me to We
Prom Committee
Reach For the Top
Science Club
Yearbook Committee

See also
List of high schools in Ontario

Toronto Catholic District School Board
High schools in Toronto
Catholic secondary schools in Ontario
Educational institutions established in 1941
Girls' schools in Canada
1941 establishments in Ontario